Feng was a legendary Jutish chieftain and the prototype for William Shakespeare's King Claudius. He appears in Chronicon Lethrense and in Saxo Grammaticus' Gesta Danorum (book 3).

The Chronicon Lethrense (and the included Annales Lundenses) tell that the Danish king Rorik Slengeborre put Horwendill and Feng as his rulers in Jutland, and gave his daughter to Horwendill as a reward for his good services. Horwendill and the daughter had the son Amblothe (Hamlet). The jealous Feng killed Horwendill and took his wife. Amblothe understood that his life was in danger and tried to survive by faking insanity. Feng sent Amblothe to the king of Britain with two servants carrying a message that the British king should kill Amblothe. While the servants slept, Amblothe carved off the (probably runic) message and wrote that the servants should be killed and himself married to the king's daughter. The British king did what the message said. Exactly one year later, Feng drank to Amblothe's memory, but Amblothe appeared and killed him.

According to Saxo, Feng and Horwendill were the sons of Jutland's ruler Gervendill, and succeeded him as the rulers of Jutland. Rørik Slyngebond, king of Denmark, gave his daughter to Horwendill and she bore him the son Amleth. But Feng, out of jealousy, murdered Horwendill, and persuaded Gerutha to become his wife, on the plea that he had committed the crime for no other reason than to avenge her of a husband by whom she had been hated. Amleth, afraid of sharing his father's fate, pretended to be imbecile, but the suspicion of Feng put him to various tests which are related in detail. Among other things they sought to entangle him with a young girl, his foster-sister, but his cunning saved him. When, however, Amleth slew the eavesdropper hidden, like Polonius, in his mother's room, and destroyed all trace of the deed, Feng was assured that the young man's madness was feigned. Accordingly, he dispatched him to England in company with two attendants, who bore a letter enjoining the king of the country to put him to death. Amleth surmised the purport of their instructions, and secretly altered the message on their wooden tablets to the effect that the king should put the attendants to death and give Amleth his daughter in marriage.

After marrying the princess Amleth returned at the end of a year to Denmark. Of the wealth he had accumulated he took with him only certain hollow sticks filled with gold. He arrived in time for a funeral feast, held to celebrate his supposed death. During the feast he plied the courtiers with wine, and executed his vengeance during their drunken sleep by fastening down over them the woolen hangings of the hall with pegs he had sharpened during his feigned madness, and then setting fire to the palace. He then killed Feng with his own sword.

As can be seen, many plot elements of Shakespeare's Hamlet are present in this account. However, they are placed in Jutland - the diametrical opposite side of Denmark from Elsinore, which had become identified with Hamlet due to the Shakespearean account.

External links
Peter Tunstall's translation of the Chronicon lethrense at The Chronicle of the Kings of Lejre and Northvegr: The Saga of Hrolf Kraki: The Chronicle of the Kings of Lejre.
Book Three of Gesta Danorum at the Medieval and Classical Literature Library 

Legendary Danish people
Jutish people
Regicides
Amleth